Adrián González Morales (born 25 May 1988), known simply as Adrián, is a Spanish former professional footballer who played as a central midfielder.

His career was spent mostly in La Liga, where he totalled 243 games in service of Getafe, Racing de Santander, Rayo Vallecano, Elche, Eibar and Málaga (20 goals), adding 179 in the Segunda División for six teams.

Club career
A product of Real Madrid's youth system, Madrid-born Adrián spent 2006–07 with the reserves Real Madrid Castilla where he was trained by his father, former club legend Míchel. He then served two Segunda División loans the following season, with RC Celta de Vigo and Gimnàstic de Tarragona, being sparingly used by both sides.

In late May 2008, Adrián was bought by another team from the capital, Getafe CF, with Real Madrid having the option to re-buy the player. He made his competitive debut on 5 October, playing 15 minutes in a 2–2 home draw against UD Almería. Midway through the campaign, he would be again coached by his father after the dismissal of Víctor Muñoz.

Adrián started in many games of 2009–10, which brought heavy criticism on coach Míchel, who was accused of nepotism. He lost his starting position midway through the season but eventually returned, scoring his first goal in La Liga on 25 April 2010 as Getafe downed Sevilla FC 4–3 at home – he also provided an assist in the match– and completed the last three fixtures as the club collected seven points and qualified for the UEFA Europa League as sixth.

In mid-August 2010, Adrián terminated his contract and joined Racing de Santander in the same league. A starter throughout most of the campaign although he rarely finished a match, he made his official debut with the Cantabrians on 29 August in a 0–3 home loss against FC Barcelona.

After his team's relegation in 2012, Adrián went back to his hometown and signed a two-year deal at Rayo Vallecano. Mainly a substitute in his first year, he scored his first goal on 25 September 2013 in a 4–1 defeat at Sevilla, adding two more on 19 December in the 3–1 win over Real Valladolid in the Copa del Rey.

On 26 June 2014, Adrián joined Elche CF for two years. Following their administrative relegation from the top flight, he took part in pre-season before cutting ties in mid-August 2015, linking with SD Eibar for the next three years. He scored five goals in his first season in the Basque Country, including one on his debut in a 3–1 away victory against Granada CF.

Adrián reunited with his father at Málaga CF on 23 May 2017, after agreeing to a three-year contract with the option for a further season. With the Andalusians back in division two in the 2018–19 campaign, the competent penalty taker scored a career-best ten goals.

On 7 September 2020, Adrián signed a two-year deal with Real Zaragoza also of the second tier. He became a free agent 20 January 2022 and, the following day, the 33-year-old joined fellow second division side CF Fuenlabrada on a short-term contract.

International career
Adrián won his only cap for the Spain under-21 team on 10 February 2009, as a 70th-minute substitute for Diego Capel in the 1–1 friendly draw with Norway in Cartagena.

Club statistics

References

External links

1988 births
Living people
Spanish footballers
Footballers from Madrid
Association football midfielders
La Liga players
Segunda División players
Real Madrid Castilla footballers
RC Celta de Vigo players
Gimnàstic de Tarragona footballers
Getafe CF footballers
Racing de Santander players
Rayo Vallecano players
Elche CF players
SD Eibar footballers
Málaga CF players
Real Zaragoza players
CF Fuenlabrada footballers
Spain youth international footballers
Spain under-21 international footballers
Spanish expatriate sportspeople in Greece